Panagiotis Ballas (born 6 September 1993) is a Greek professional footballer who plays as a defensive midfielder for Super League 2 club Anagennisi Karditsa.

Club career 

He joined Atromitos in 2008 from Akadimia Elpides Karditsas. He made his debut for the first team in a home game against Kavala, on the final matchday of the 2010–11 season.

On 8 September 2017, he signed a three-year contract with AEL, on a free transfer.

Career statistics

Club

References

External links 
 
 Atromitos F.C. profile

1993 births
Living people
Greek footballers
Greece under-21 international footballers
Greece youth international footballers
Super League Greece players
3. Liga players
Super League Greece 2 players
Atromitos F.C. players
SG Sonnenhof Großaspach players
Panionios F.C. players
Athlitiki Enosi Larissa F.C. players
Apollon Larissa F.C. players
Anagennisi Karditsa F.C. players
Greek expatriate footballers
Greek expatriate sportspeople in Germany
Expatriate footballers in Germany
Association football midfielders
Footballers from Karditsa